or  in the Nihon Shoki, also called  or  in the Kojiki, refers to a netherworld in Japanese mythology. There is no clear consensus on the relationship between these three realms.

The god Susanoo is described as the ruler of Ne-no-kuni. There are differing accounts on how he assumed this position:

Susanoo ignored this command and kept crying over the loss of his dead mother Izanami, such that his weeping lead to death and destruction. As Susanoo wished, Izanagi expelled him to be near his mother in Ne-no-kata-su-kuni. In the previous episodes about Izanami's death this land is called Yomi.

The Nihon Shoki mentions Ne-no-kuni in passing when describing an episode where Susanoo was banished from Takama-ga-hara for various evil acts he committed, and went to a place called (Soko-tsu-)Ne-no-kuni.

According to the Kojiki when Ōkuninushi visited Ne-no-kuni and insulted Susanoo he was submitted to overcome three ordeals, one being described to sleep in a house infested with snakes, centipedes and wasps. This is sometimes taken as another hint that Ne-no-kuni is a subterranean realm. One explanation of the myth contrasts the trials of Ōkuninushi to a symbolic death through rites of initiation that cause one to become reborn into a new life. In this story, death doesn't pollute, it regenerates. The land of the dead also contains the forces of life, tama.

Kunio Yanagita compared Ne no Kuni to the Niraikanai of the Ryukyuan religion. This paradisaical land is situated beyond the seas.

References

Afterlife places
Locations in Japanese mythology
Underworld
Mythological places